The al-Quds Hospital was a hospital located in the Gaza Strip (territory of the State of Palestine), which was damaged by Israeli forces in 2009. Plans for repairing the hospital started soon afterwards, with the support of France and Qatar.

See also 
The Red Crescent Society, Jerusalem runs a teaching hospital at Al-Quds University.

References 

Hospitals in Gaza City
2001 establishments in the Palestinian territories